This is a list of notable graduates of the University of Pennsylvania Law School. For a list of notable graduates of the University of Pennsylvania as a whole, see List of University of Pennsylvania people

Law and government

U.S. government

Executive branch
 Philip Werner Amram, Asst. Attorney General of the United States, 1939–42
 Marshall Jordan Breger, chairman, Administrative Conference of the United States; United States Solicitor of Labor
 William H. Brown, III, chairman, EEOC
 Jonathan Z. Cannon, EPA Deputy Administrator, 2009–
 Gilbert F. Casellas, chairman, EEOC and General Counsel of the Air Force
Walter Joseph "Jay" Clayton III (Penn Law Class of 1993), chair of the U.S. Securities and Exchange Commission, May 4, 2017 through December 23, 2020
 Josiah E. DuBois Jr., U.S. State Department official, instrumental in Holocaust rescue
 Thomas K. Finletter, U.S Secretary of the Air Force, 1950–1953; Ambassador to NATO, 1961–65
 Lindley Miller Garrison, U.S. Secretary of War, 1913–16
 William B. Gray, United States Attorney for Vermont, 1977-1981
 Earl G. Harrison, Commissioner of the U.S. Immigration and Naturalization Service, 1942–44
 William M. Meredith, U.S. Secretary of the Treasury, 1849–50
Heath Tarbert Nominee for Assistant Secretary of the Treasury for International Markets and Development in the U.S. (2017)
 Robert J. Walker, U.S. Secretary of the Treasury, 1840–45
 George Washington, Honorary Doctor of Law, Class of 1783<ref>The Pennsylvania Gazette page 80 of Jan/Feb 2021 Issue</ref>
 George W. Wickersham, Attorney General of the United States, 1909–1913; instrumental in the breakup of Standard Oil; President of the Council on Foreign Relations (1933–36)
 George Washington Woodruff, Class of 1895, Acting U.S. Secretary of the Interior under President Theodore Roosevelt

Judicial branch
 Arlin Adams, Judge, U.S. Court of Appeals for the Third Circuit, 1969–1987
 Guy K. Bard, Judge, U.S. Dist. Court, E.D. Pa.
 Harvey Bartle III, Judge, U.S. Dist. Court, E.D. Pa.
 Michael Baylson, Judge, U.S. Dist. Court, E.D. Pa.
 Ralph C. Body, Judge, U.S. Dist. Court, E.D. Pa., 1965–73
 Raymond J. Broderick, Judge, U.S. Dist. Court, E.D. Pa.
 Margo Kitsy Brodie, Judge, U.S. Dist. Court, E.D. NY
 Allison Dale Burroughs, Class of 1988, (born April 25, 1961) is a United States district judge of the United States District Court for the District of Massachusetts who received her federal judicial commission on December 19, 2014, and was sworn in on January 7, 2015. Judge Burroughs began her legal career as a law clerk for fellow Penn Law alumna Judge Norma L. Shapiro of the United States District Court for the Eastern District of Pennsylvania from 1988 to 1989 and also served as an Assistant United States Attorney in the Eastern District of Pennsylvania from 1989 to 1995 and in the District of Massachusetts from 1995 to 2005.
 A. Richard Caputo, Judge, U.S. Dist. Court, M.D. Pa.
 Tanya S. Chutkan, class of 1987, Judge, U.S. Dist. Court, D.C.
 Rudolph Contreras, Judge, U.S. Dist. Court, D.C.
 James Harry Covington, Judge, U.S. Dist. Court, D.C.; Co-founder of Covington & Burling
 George M. Dallas, Judge, U.S. Court of Appeals for the Third Circuit, 1892–1909
 Stewart Dalzell (September 18, 1943 – February 18, 2019), who graduated from the University of Pennsylvania, Wharton School of Business with a Bachelor of Science degree in 1965 and received his Juris Doctor from the University of Pennsylvania Law School in 1969, was a United States district judge of the United States District Court for the Eastern District of Pennsylvania.
John Morgan Davis, Judge, U.S. Dist. Court, E.D. Pa., 1964–84
 John Warren Davis, former judge for both the U.S. District Court for the District of New Jersey and the United States Court of Appeals for the Third Circuit
 Paul S. Diamond, Judge, U.S. Dist. Court, E.D. Pa.
 John William Ditter Jr., Judge, U.S. Dist. Court, E.D. Pa.
 Herbert Allan Fogel, Judge, U.S. Dist. Court, E.D. Pa., 1973–78
 James Halpern, Judge, U.S. Tax Court, 1990–2005
 James Hunter III, Judge, U.S. Court of Appeals for the Third Circuit, 1971–1989
 Daniel Henry Huyett III, Judge, U.S. Dist. Court, E.D. Pa., 1970–98
 Abdul Kallon, Judge, U.S. Dist. Court, N.D. Al.
 Harry Ellis Kalodner, Chief Judge, U.S. Court of Appeals for the Third Circuit, 1946–1977
 William Huntington Kirkpatrick, Judge, U.S. Dist. Court, E.D. Pa, 1927–58
 John C. Knox, Judge, U.S. Dist. Court, S.D.N.Y., 1948–55
 Charles William Kraft Jr., Judge, U.S. Dist. Court, E.D. Pa., 1956–2002
 Phyllis A. Kravitch, Judge, U.S. Court of Appeals for the Eleventh Circuit
 Robert Lowe Kunzig, Judge, U.S. Court of Claims, 1971–82
 Caleb Rodney Layton III, Judge, U.S. Dist. Court, D.E., 1957–88
 Paul Conway Leahy, Judge, U.S. Dist. Court, D.E., 1942–66
 James Russell Leech, Judge, U.S. Tax Court, 1932–52
Joseph Simon Lord III, Judge, U.S. Dist. Court, E.D. Pa., 1961–92
 Alfred Leopold Luongo, Judge, U.S. Dist. Court, E.D. Pa., 1961–86
 Thomas Ambrose Masterson, Judge, U.S. Dist. Court, E.D. Pa, 1967–73
 James Focht McClure Jr., Judge, U.S. Dist. Court, M.D. Pa.
 Barron Patterson McCune, Judge, U.S. Dist. Court, W.D. Pa.
Joseph Leo McGlynn Jr., Judge, U.S. Dist. Court, E.D. Pa., 1974–99
 Gerald Austin McHugh Jr., Judge, U.S. Dist. Court, E.D. Pa., 2014–
 Charles Louis McKeehan, Judge, U.S. Dist. Court, E.D. Pa., 1923–25
 Roderick R. McKelvie, Judge, U.S. Dist. Court, D.E., 1991–2002
 Mary A. McLaughlin, Judge, U.S. Dist. Court, E.D. Pa.
 John Bayard McPherson, Judge, U.S. Court of Appeals for the Third Circuit, 1912–1919 (Read)
 John W. Murphy, Judge, U.S. Dist. Court, M.D. Pa., 1946–62
 Thomas Newman O'Neill Jr., Judge, U.S. Dist. Court, E.D. Pa.,
 Gene E. K. Pratter, Judge, U.S. Dist. Court, E.D. Pa.
 Arthur Raymond Randolph, Judge, U.S. Court of Appeals for the District of Columbia Circuit
 Owen J. Roberts, Justice, Supreme Court of the United States
 Sue Lewis Robinson, Judge, U.S. Dist. Court, D.E.
 Max Rosenn, Judge, U.S. Court of Appeals for the Third Circuit, 1970–2006
 Juan Ramon Sánchez, Judge, U.S. Dist. Court, E.D. Pa.
 Ralph Francis Scalera, Judge, U.S. Dist. Court, W.D. Pa.
 Allen G. Schwartz, Judge, U.S. Dist. Court, S.D.N.Y., 1993–2003
 Murray Merle Schwartz, Chief Judge, U.S. Dist. Court, D.E, 1974–
 Norma Levy Shapiro, Judge, U.S. Dist. Court, E.D. Pa.
 Patty Shwartz, Class of 1986, Judge, United States Court of Appeals for the Third Circuit, assumed office April 10, 2013
 Jerome B. Simandle, Judge, U.S. Dist. Court N.J.
 Dolores Sloviter, Judge, U.S. Court of Appeals for the Third Circuit
 Charles Swayne, Judge, U.S. Dist. Court, N.D. Florida, 1890–1907
 Joseph Whitaker Thompson, Judge, U.S. Court of Appeals for the Third Circuit, 1931–1946
 Donald West VanArtsdalen, Judge, U.S. Dist. Court, E.D. Pa., 1970–85
Jay Waldman, Judge, U.S. Dist. Court, E.D. Pa., 1988–2003
 Henry Galbraith Ward, Judge, U.S. Court of Appeals for the Second Circuit, 1907–1921
 Gerald Joseph Weber, Judge, U.S. Dist. Court, W.D. Pa.
 Helene White, Judge, U.S. Court of Appeals for the Sixth Circuit
 James Wilson, Justice, Supreme Court of the United States (Hon. LL.D); founder of the Law School; signer of the Declaration of Independence
 Scott Wilson, Judge, U.S. Court of Appeals for the First Circuit, 1929–42
 Harold Kenneth Wood, Judge, U.S. Dist. Court, E.D. Pa, 1959–71

Legislative branch
 Ephraim Leister Acker, LL.B., (Penn Law Class of 1886) and M.D., (Penn Med Class of 1852): elected as a Democrat to Pennsylvania representative to the Forty-second Congress (March 4, 1871 – March 3, 1873)
 Wilbur L. Adams, Delaware representative to the U.S. Congress, 1933–35
 George F. Brumm, Pennsylvania representative to the U.S. Congress, 1929–34
 Joseph Maull Carey, U. S. Senator from Wyoming, 1890–1895; Governor of Wyoming, 1911–1915; Wyoming delegate to the U.S. Congress, 1885–1890, and Justice on  Wyoming Supreme Court
 Matt Cartwright, (born May 1, 1961) Penn Law Class of 1986: first elected in 2012, for term starting in January 2013, as a member of the Democratic Party,  to the United States representative from Pennsylvania's 8th congressional district, which district was numbered as the 17th district from 2013 through 2019 (and includes a large swath of northeastern Pennsylvania, anchored by Scranton, Wilkes-Barre, and the Poconos) when he defeated 10-term incumbent Blue Dog Tim Holden, the then Dean of the Pennsylvania Congressional delegation, in the Democratic primary and went on to defeat Republican Laureen Cummings in the general election 
 Bernard G. Caulfield, Illinois representative to the U.S. Congress, 1874–77
 E. Wallace Chadwick, Pennsylvania representative to the U.S. Congress, 1947–49
 Joseph Sill Clark, U.S. Senator from Pennsylvania, 1957–69
 Joel Cook, Pennsylvania representative to the U.S. Congress, 1907–11
 James Harry Covington, Maryland representative to the U.S. Congress, 1909–14
 Willard S. Curtin: (Class of 1932) Pennsylvania representative to the U.S. Congress, 1957–1967, having been elected as a Republican to the Eighty-fifth and to the four succeeding Congresses (and his election triumphs included defeating noted author James A. Michener in the 1962 election) and respected for voting in favor of the Civil Rights Acts of 1957, 1960, and 1964, as well as the 24th Amendment to the U.S. Constitution and the Voting Rights Act of 1965
 John Burrwood Daly, Pennsylvania Representative to the U.S. Congress, 1939–35
 James Henderson Duff, U.S. Senator from Pennsylvania, 1951–57
 Joshua Eilberg, Pennsylvania representative to the U.S. Congress, 1967–79
 Clare G. Fenerty, Pennsylvania representative to the U.S. Congress, 1935–37
 Oliver Walter Frey, Pennsylvania representative to the U.S. Congress, 1933–39
 Benjamin Golder, Pennsylvania representative to the U.S. Congress, 1925–33
 George Scott Graham, Pennsylvania representative to the U.S. Congress, 1913–31
 Francis Hopkinson, New Jersey delegate to the Continental Congress; Signer of the Declaration of Independence, (1737–1791)
 Everett Kent, Pennsylvania representative to the U.S. Congress, 1923–25, 1927–29
 William Huntington Kirkpatrick, Pennsylvania representative to the U.S. Congress, 1921–23
 Conor Lamb (born June 27, 1984) Penn Law Class of 2009: a member of Democratic Party who was elected in January 2019 to serve as U.S. Representative from Pennsylvania's 17th congressional district (a district serving most of the northwestern suburbs of Pittsburgh), but was first elected to Congress in March 2018 from the neighboring  in a special election that attracted national attention
 James Russell Leech, Pennsylvania representative to the U.S. Congress, 1927–32
 William Eckart Lehman, Pennsylvania representative to the U.S. Congress, 1860–62
 John Thomas Lenahan, Pennsylvania representative to the U.S. Congress, 1907–09
 Lloyd Lowndes Jr., Maryland representative to the U.S. Congress, 1873–75
 James McDevitt Magee, Pennsylvania representative to the U.S. Congress, 1923–27
 Levi Maish, Pennsylvania representative to the U.S. Congress, 1875–79 and 1887–91
 Joseph M. McDade, Pennsylvania representative to the U.S. Congress, 1963–99
 Thomas C. McGrath Jr., New Jersey representative to the U.S. Congress
 Edward de Veaux Morrell, Pennsylvania representative to the U.S. Congress, 1900–07
 John Murphy, Pennsylvania representative to the U.S. Congress, 1943–46
 Leonard Myers, Pennsylvania representative to the U.S. Congress, 1863–75
 Robert N.C. Nix Sr., Pennsylvania representative to the U.S. Congress, 1958–79
 Cyrus Maffet Palmer, Pennsylvania representative to the U.S. Congress, 1927–29
 George Wharton Pepper, U.S. Senator from Pennsylvania, chronicler of the Senate
 Albert G. Rutherford, Pennsylvania representative to the U.S. Congress, 1937–41
 Leon Sacks, Pennsylvania representative to the U.S. Congress, 1937–41
 Hardie Scott, Pennsylvania representative to the U.S. Congress, 1947–53
 John Roger Kirkpatrick Scott, Pennsylvania representative to the U.S. Congress, 1915–19
 William Biddle Shepard, North Carolina representative to the U.S. Congress, 1829–37
 Edward J. Stack, Florida representative to the U.S. Congress, 1979–81
 William I. Troutman, Pennsylvania representative to the U.S. Congress, 1943–45
 William H. Wilson, Pennsylvania representative to the U.S. Congress, 1935–37
 Charles A. Wolverton, New Jersey representative to the U.S. Congress, 1927–59

 Diplomatic 
 George Charles Bruno, United States Ambassador to Belize (1994–1997)
David L. Cohen (Class of 1981): Nominated on July 21, 2021 to be United States Ambassador to Canada
 Charles A. Heimbold, Jr., United States Ambassador to Sweden
 Morton Charles Hill (diplomat) (April 28, 1936 – March 27, 2021) (Penn Law Class of 1960, JD, Penn Graduate School Class of 1961, MA) Yale University Diplomat in Residence and Lecturer  and United States State Department Foreign Service diplomat
 Martin J. Silverstein, United States Ambassador to Uruguay
 Stuart E. Jones, Class of 1986, United States Ambassador to Iraq from 2014 to 2016, and United States Ambassador to Jordan from July 21, 2011, to July 28, 2014.
 Faith Ryan Whittlesey, United States Ambassador to Switzerland

State government

Executive
 John Cromwell Bell Sr., Class of 1884 (father of Penn Law Alumni, former Pennsylvania Governor and Chief Justice of Pennsylvania Supreme Court John C. Bell, Jr. and former NFL Commissioner DeBenneville Bert Bell and son in law of Penn Law alumnus and former United States House of Representatives member  Leonard Myers) District Attorney of Philadelphia (1903–1907) and 45th Attorney General of Pennsylvania (January 17, 1911 – January 19, 1915); also served as director of Penn's athletic program, chairman of its football committee, and from 1911 onwards, was a trustee where he helped found the NCAA
 John C. Bell, Jr., Class of 1917, (October 25, 1892 – March 18, 1974) was the 18th Lieutenant Governor of Pennsylvania (1943–1947) before becoming the 33rd and shortest-serving Governor of Pennsylvania, serving for nineteen (19) days in 1947, 1937–37
 Raymond J. Broderick, Lt. Governor of Pennsylvania
 Francis Shunk Brown, Pennsylvania Attorney General, 1915–19
 Joseph M. Carey, Class of 1864, Governor of Wyoming, 1911–1915
 John Morgan Davis, Lt. Governor of Pennsylvania, 1959–63
 Paula Dow, Attorney General of New Jersey, 2010–2012
 John Hanger, Secretary of the Pennsylvania Department of Environmental Protection, 2008–2011; Commissioner of the Pennsylvania Public Utility Commission, 1993–1998
 James Henderson Duff, Governor of Pennsylvania, 1947–51
 William F. Hyland, Attorney General of New Jersey, 1974–1978
 Lloyd Lowndes, Governor of Maryland, 1896–1900
 John G. McCullough, Attorney General of California during the American Civil War; Governor of Vermont, 1902–1904
 Charles R. Miller, Governor of Delaware, 1913–17
 Samuel W. Pennypacker, Governor of Pennsylvania, 1903–07
 David Samson, Attorney General of New Jersey, 2002–03
 William A. Schnader, Attorney General of Pennsylvania (1930–34); a drafter of the Uniform Commercial Code

Judicial
 Thomas J. Baldrige, Pennsylvania Attorney General, Judge and President Judge of Superior Court of Pennsylvania
 John C. Bell Jr. (October 25, 1892 – March 18, 1974), Class of 1917, was a Justice of the Pennsylvania Supreme Court (1950–1972), serving as Chief Justice from 1961 to 1972
 Joseph M. Carey served as Justice on  Wyoming Supreme Court (also Mayor of Cheyenne, Wyoming, U.S. Attorney for the Territory of Wyoming, Governor of Wyoming, U.S. Representative for Wyoming, U.S. Senator for Wyoming)
 Hampton L. Carson, Pennsylvania Attorney General, 1903–07
 James Harry Covington, Chief Justice of the District of Columbia Supreme Court (and co-founder of Covington & Burling)
 Harold L. Ervin, Pennsylvania Superior Court judge from 1954 to 1967.
 Gerald Garson, NY Supreme Court Justice, convicted of bribery
 Richard L. Gabriel, Class of 1987, (born March 3, 1962) was appointed in 2015 (and continues to serve after being retained in 2018) as an Associate Justice of the Colorado Supreme Court. Justice Gabriel previously served on the Colorado Court of Appeals from 2008 to 2015
 Raymond Headen (Penn Law Class of 1987), Judge on the 8th District Court of Appeals of Ohio
 Randy J. Holland, Justice of the Delaware Supreme Court, 1986–present (left bench in 2017)
 Joseph L. Kun, Judge, Court of Common Pleas of Philadelphia.
 Peter B. Krauser, Chief Judge on the Court of Special Appeals for the state of Maryland and past Chair of the Maryland Democratic Party
 Daniel J. Layton, Chief Justice of the Delaware Supreme Court, 1933–45 and Attorney General of Delaware, 1932–33
 Steve P. Leskinen, Judge Pennsylvania Court of Common Pleas (Fayette County)
Albert Dutton MacDade, Pennsylvania State Senator, 1921–1929, Judge Pennsylvania Court of Common Pleas (Delaware County), 1942–1948
 Robert N. C. Nix Jr., Chief Justice of the Pennsylvania Supreme Court, 1984–96; the first African-American Chief Justice of any state's highest court; Justice of the Pa. Supreme Court, 1971–84
 John W. Noble, Vice Chancellor, Delaware Court of Chancery
 Joseph B. Perskie (1885–1957; class of 1907), Associate Justice of the New Jersey Supreme Court from 1933 to 1947.
 Deborah T. Poritz, Chief Justice of the New Jersey Supreme Court, 1996–2006
 Horace Stern, Chief Justice of the Pennsylvania Supreme Court, 1952–56
 Leo E. Strine Jr., class of 1988, Chief Justice, Delaware Supreme Court (left bench in 2019)
Karen L. Valihura (Penn Law Class of 1986)  Justice of the Delaware Supreme Court (appointed June 6, 2014)

Legislative
 Harry W. Bass, (Penn Law Class of 1896) first African American member of the Pennsylvania House of Representatives, 1911–1914
John C. Grady, (Penn Law Class of 1870) Pennsylvania Senator for the 7th district from 1877 to 1903 and President Pro Tempore of the Pennsylvania Senate from 1887 to 1890
 Bruce Marks (Penn Law Class of 1984) Pennsylvania Senator for 2nd senatorial district from 1994 to 1995

Other
 David Norcross, past Chairman of the New Jersey Republican State Committee

City government
 Joseph M. Carey served as the 14th Mayor of Cheyenne, Wyoming (also U.S. Attorney for the Territory of Wyoming, Governor of Wyoming, U.S. Representative for Wyoming, U.S. Senator for Wyoming, and Justice on  Wyoming Supreme Court)
 John Cromwell Bell, Sr., Class of 1884, was District Attorney of Philadelphia (1903–1907)
 Joseph S. Clark, Mayor of Philadelphia, 1952–56
 Mark Farrell:  (Class of 2001) Mayor of San Francisco in 2018
Shirley Franklin: Mayor of Atlanta, 2002–10
 Judith Flanagan Kennedy (Class of 1987) was the 56th mayor of Lynn, Massachusetts (2010 through 2018) who launched a write-in campaign for mayor after the death of candidate Patrick J. McManus and defeated incumbent Edward J. Clancy, Jr. on November 3, 2009, and became Lynn's first female mayor and in 2013 was elected to a second, four-year term.
 Oscar Goodman, Mayor of Las Vegas, 1999–2011
 Henry W. Sawyer, Philadelphia City Council, 1956–1960
 Ken Trujillo (Penn Law Class of 1986) served as Philadelphia City Solicitor and an Assistant U.S. Attorney winning a historic settlement against gun manufacturers

Non-United States government

 Politics 
 Donald Duke, former Commissioner for Finance of Cross River State, Nigeria; former presidential candidate; Governor of Cross River State, Nigeria (1999–2007)
 John Wallace de Beque Farris, (Penn Law Class of 1900) member of the senate of Canada (1937–1970); Attorney General of Vancouver (1917–1920)
 Raul Roco, former presidential candidate; Secretary of Education in the Philippines (Fellow)

 Judicial 
 Sir Ronald Wilson, former Justice of the High Court of Australia, the highest court in the nation
 Gerard Hogan, from 2014 - 2018 was a justice of the Court of Appeal of Ireland.
 Yvonne Mokgoro, Class of 1990, former Justice of the Constitutional Court of South Africa, the Supreme Constitutional Court of South Africa

 Diplomatic 
 Alfredo Toro Hardy (Penn Law LLM Class of 1979), former Ambassador of Venezuela to the United States, the United Kingdom, Spain, Brazil, Chile, Ireland and Singapore
 Andrea Canepari, Ambassador of Italy to the Dominican Republic from 2017 to 2021.

Academia

University Presidents
 Janice R. Bellace, first president of Singapore Management University
 Fred Hilmer, Vice-Chancellor of the University of New South Wales
 Peter J. Liacouras, Chancellor of Temple University
 Mark Yudof, President of the University of California System

Legal academics
 Khaled Abou El Fadl, professor of law at UCLA School of Law; scholar of Islamic law, immigration, human rights, international and national security law
 Azizah Y. al-Hibri, Professor of Law at the University of Richmond; founding editor of Hypatia: a Journal of Feminist Philosophy; founder and president of KARAMAH: Muslim Women Lawyers for Human Rights
 Anthony G. Amsterdam, professor of law at NYU Law School
 Loftus Becker, professor of law the University of Connecticut School of Law
 Janice R. Bellace, Director of the Huntsman Program in International Studies and Business at the Wharton School of Business
 Francis Bohlen (1868–1942), Algernon Sydney Biddle professor of law at the University of Pennsylvania Law School
 Robert Butkin, Dean of the University of Tulsa College of Law; State Treasurer of Oklahoma
Jonathan Z. Cannon, Blaine T. Phillips Distinguished Professor of Environmental Law at the University of Virginia School of Law; Deputy Administrator of the EPA
Jesse H. Choper, Earl Warren Professor of Public Law at the University of California, Berkeley Law School
George M. Cohen, Brokaw Professor of Corporate Law at the University of Virginia School of Law
Debra W. Denno, Arthur A. McGivney Professor of Law at Fordham Law School
Theodore Eisenberg, Henry Allen Mark Professor of Law at Cornell Law School
Douglas Frenkel, Morris Shuster Practice Professor of Law at the University of Pennsylvania Law School
 Marci Hamilton, Paul R. Verkuil Chair of Public Law at the Benjamin N. Cardozo School of Law; constitutional law scholar
 Maryam Jamshidi, Assistant Professor of Law, University of Florida Levin College of Law
 Kimberly Kessler Ferzan, Professor of Law and Philosophy, University of Pennsylvania Law School
Noyes Leech (1921–2010), law professor at the University of Pennsylvania Law School
A. Leo Levin (1919–2015), law professor at the University of Pennsylvania Law School
Robert J. Levy, former William L. Prosser Professor of Law at the University of Minnesota
Beverly I. Moran, Professor of Law, Vanderbilt Law School
David G. Owen, Carolina Distinguished Professor of Law, University of South Carolina Law School
 Curtis Reitz (born c. 1930), Algernon Sydney Biddle Professor of Law at the University of Pennsylvania Law School
Jennifer Rosato Perea, Class of 1987, Dean, DePaul University College of Law
Alan Miles Ruben (born 1931), Penn College Class of 1953, A.B., University of Pennsylvania School of Arts and Sciences graduate school Class of 1956, M.A. and Penn Law Class of 1956, LL.B. where he was an Editor of the University of Pennsylvania Law Review; serves as the Editor-in-Chief of the standard treatise “How Arbitration Works”; serves as Professor Emeritus Cleveland-Marshall College of Law (1970 to 2003) and earned a Guggenheim Fellowship, selected as a Fulbright Scholar (1993) and as an Advisory Professor of Law Fudan University in Shanghai, China; Member Greater Cleveland Sports Hall of Fame (Class of 1976) as fencer who captained both the U.S. team at 1972 Olympics and 1971 Pan-American games; made $500,000 commitment in will to create the Alan Miles Ruben and Betty Willis Ruben Endowed Professorship in the Cleveland-Marshall College of Law
Stephen A. Saltzburg, Wallace and Beverley Woodbury University Professor of Law at the George Washington University Law School
Louis B. Schwartz (1913–2003), law professor at the University of Pennsylvania Law School
 M. Michael Sharlot, Wright C. Morrow Professor of Law, University of Texas Law School
 Karen Tani, Professor of Law, University of California, Berkeley School of Law; legal historian
Jonathan D. Varat, professor of law; Dean of the UCLA School of Law (1998–2003); author of popular constitutional law casebook
 Tess Wilkinson-Ryan, Professor of Law and Psychology, University of Pennsylvania Law School
James Wilson (1742–1798), First Professor of Law at University of Pennsylvania, 1789 through 1798, the only person who signed the Declaration of Independence, the United States Constitution, and served as a Supreme Court Justice, during the Constitutional Convention, successfully proposed a unitary executive elected through an electoral college system and negotiated the Three-Fifths Compromise, delivered a series of lectures on law to President George Washington, Vice President John Adams, Secretary of State Thomas Jefferson, Secretary of the Treasury Alexander Hamilton, and numerous members of Congress with Wilson's first lecture on law being given to aforementioned government leaders on December 15, 1789
Bernard Wolfman (1924–2011), Dean of the University of Pennsylvania Law School and its Gemmill Professor of Tax Law and Tax Policy, Fessenden Professor of Law Emeritus at Harvard Law School
 Michael Yelnosky, Class of 1987, Dean, Roger Williams University School of Law, the law school of Roger Williams University

 Other academics
 Morton Charles Hill (diplomat) (April 28, 1936 – March 27, 2021) (Penn Law Class of 1960, JD, Penn Graduate School Class of 1961, MA) Yale University Diplomat in Residence and Lecturer  and United States State Department Foreign Service diplomat

Activists
Sadie Tanner Mossell Alexander, first African-American woman to receive a Ph.D. in Economics in the United States; first African-American woman to graduate from Penn Law; first African-American woman to be admitted to the Pennsylvania Bar; civil rights activist; appointed to the Civil Rights Commission by President Harry S. Truman
Stuart F. Feldman, co-founder of Vietnam Veterans of America
Caroline Burnham Kilgore (LL.B.), first woman to graduate from Penn with a law degree;  first woman to practice law in Pennsylvania; argued for a woman's right to vote before the Pennsylvania Supreme Court; first woman in New York to earn a medical degree

Arts and entertainment
Benjamin Glazer, Academy Award-winning screenwriter and producer
 Moe Jaffe, songwriter and bandleader
 Pam Jenoff, novelist
 Kimberly McCreight, author and lawyer
 El McMeen, guitarist
 Henry Chapman Mercer, archaeologist
 Tom Rapp, songwriter, Pearls Before Swine.
 Lisa Scottoline, author of legal thrillers; New York Times best-selling author
 Michael A. Smerconish, Class of 1987, (born March 15, 1962), broadcasts The Michael Smerconish Program on SiriusXM POTUS Channel (124), hosts a CNN and CNN International program, Smerconish, at 9:00 a.m. ET on Saturdays, writes a column for The Philadelphia Inquirer, and authored seven books
 Jan Buckner Walker, cruciverbalist (crossword puzzle creator), author and games creator
 Natalie Wexler, novelist and legal scholar

Business
 Randall Boe, Class of 1987, CGC of AOL
 Safra A. Catz, Class of 1986, CFO, Oracle Corporation; Forbes list of Most Powerful Women
 David N. Feldman, Class of 1985, Wall Street financial legal expert; author of Reverse Mergers: Taking a Company Public Without an IPO Sam Hamadeh, co-founder of Vault.com
 Charles A. Heimbold, Jr., former Chairman and CEO, Bristol-Myers Squibb
 Murray Kushner, Class of 1976, real estate developer
 Gerald Levin, former CEO of AOL Time Warner
 Albert Theodore Powers, chairman and chief executive officer of the Allied Pacific Group
 Herman Albert Schaefer (born in 1921 in Philadelphia, PA and died on December 6, 2012 in Southampton, NY) Wharton School of Finance Class of 1943, B.S. in Econ., and Penn Law Class of 1948, joined the Marine Corps, where he volunteered for bomb disposal and became an officer in the Navy during World War 2 on a battle ship in the Pacific, practiced law and then earned a C.P.A. and joined an accounting firm; joined Pepsi-Cola Company, where he was Executive Vice President and CFO responsible for making the initial contact with Frito-Lay, Inc., and implementing the merger that formed PepsiCo; played 	fronton tennis (which was a demo sport) at 1968 Summer Olympicshttps://www.legacy.com/obituaries/nytimes/obituary.aspx?pid=161589213 Published in New York Times on Dec. 9, 2012 and retrieved on the internet on November 27, 2020.

Media and journalism
 Renee Chenault-Fattah, co-anchor of NBC 10 News in Philadelphia
 Adrian Cronauer, former radio disc jockey; Special Assistant to the Director of the POW/MIA Office at the Department of Defense; inspiration for the film Good Morning, Vietnam Mark Haines, host of CNBC's Squawk Box Alberto Ibarguen, President and CEO of the John S. and James L. Knight Foundation; former publisher of The Miami Herald and El Nuevo Herald Norman Pearlstine, Chief Content Officer of Bloomberg L.P.; former Editor-in-chief of Time Michael A. Smerconish, Class of 1987, (born March 15, 1962), broadcasts The Michael Smerconish Program on SiriusXM POTUS Channel (124), hosts a CNN and CNN International program, Smerconish, at 9:00 a.m. ET on Saturdays, writes a column for The Philadelphia Inquirer, and authored seven books.
Van Toffler, Class of 1983, Former President, MTV Networks 
 Lynn Toler, judge of the television series Divorce CourtSports
 Irving Baxter (March 25, 1876 through June 13, 1957), Penn Law Class of 1901,  won the gold medal in both the men's high jump and the pole vault at the 1900 Summer Olympics, in Paris, France and silver medals in all three of the standing jumps (long, triple, and high) at the 1900 Paris Olympics
 Meredith Colket (November 19, 1878 through June 7, 1947): (College Class of 1901 and Penn Law Class of 1904) winner of a silver medal in the Pole vault at the 1900 Summer Olympics in Paris and won the silver medal in the men's pole vault just behind his fellow Penn Law alumnus, Irving Baxter, who won the gold medal
 Anita DeFrantz, 1976 women's eight-oared shell bronze medalist; first woman and first African-American to represent the United States on the International Olympic Committee; IOC's first female vice president; chair of the Commission on Women and Sports
 Augustus Goetz (August 21, 1904 through December 7, 1976), Penn College Class of 1925 and Penn Law Class of 1929, competed in the men's coxed pair event at the 1928 Summer Olympics
 William John Billy Goeckel (September 3, 1871 to November 1, 1922) Penn Law Class of 1895: played for Penn's varsity baseball team from 1893 through 1895 where he was "considered the finest collegiate first baseman of his day" and played portion of one season (in 1899) for the Philadelphia Phillies; organizer and attorney for the Wilkes-Barre South Side Bank and Trust Company and chairman of Wilkes-Barre's Democratic City Committee; wrote “The Red and Blue,” which has since become the Penn theme song and was leader of University of Pennsylvania Glee Club
 Marvin Goldklang (born 1942), Wharton School of Finance Class of 1964 and Penn Law Class of 1967, owns a minority interest in the Major League Baseball team, New York Yankees, and majority interests in minor league baseball teams including Charleston, South Carolina, Oklahoma City, Oklahoma, and St. Paul, Minnesota
Thomas Truxtun Hare: (Undergraduate Class of 1901 and Penn Law Class of 1903) who at (a) 1900 Summer Olympic Games won silver medal in hammer throw and (b) 1904 Summer Olympic Games won (1) bronze medal in the 'all-rounder' (now known as the decathlon) which consisted of 100 yard run, shot put, high jump, 880 yard walk, hammer throw, pole vault, 120 yard hurdles, weight throw, long jump and one mile run, and (2) gold medal  as part of tug of war team (also a charter member of the College Football Hall of Fame) 
 John Heisman, Class of 1892, football and rugby football player and coach of football, basketball, and baseball, namesake of the Heisman Trophy who was instrumental in the first decade of the 20th century in changing the rules of rugby football to more closely relate to present rules of American football 
 Sarah Elizabeth Hughes, Class of 2018, (born May 2, 1985) a former American competitive figure skater who is the 2002 Winter Olympics Gold Medalist Champion and the 2001 World bronze medalist in ladies' singles
 Harry Arista Mackey: Penn Law Class of 1893, Captain of Penn Football Team who served as Mayor of Philadelphia from 1928 to 1932
 David Micahnik (born November 5, 1938) Penn College Class of 1960 and Penn Law Class of 1964, fenced for the University of Pennsylvania where he was a first-team All-Ivy selection in épée as a senior and the 1960 U.S. National Champion and competed in the individual and team épée events at the 1960, 1964 and 1968 Summer Olympics
 Alan Miles Ruben (born 1931) Penn College Class of 1953, 	A.B., University of Pennsylvania School of Arts and Sciences graduate school Class of 1956, M.A. and Penn Law Class of 1956, LL.B. where he was an Editor of the University of Pennsylvania Law Review; serves as the Editor-in-Chief of the standard treatise “How Arbitration Works”; serves as Professor Emeritus Cleveland-Marshall College of Law (1970 to 2003) and Guggenheim Scholar Fulbright Scholar (1993) and subsequently Advisory Professor of Law  FuDan University in Shanghai, China; Member Greater Cleveland Sports Hall of Fame (Class of 1976) as fencer who captained both the U.S. team at 1972 Olympics and 1971 Pan-American games; made $500,000 commitment in will to create the Alan Miles Ruben and Betty Willis Ruben Endowed Professorship in the Cleveland-Marshall College of Law
 Herman Albert Schaefer (born in 1921 in Philadelphia, PA and died on December 6, 2012, in Southampton, NY) Wharton School of Finance Class of 1943, B.S. in Econ., and Penn Law Class of 1948, joined the Marine Corps, where he volunteered for bomb disposal and became an officer in the Navy during World War 2 on a battle ship in the Pacific, practiced law and then earned a C.P.A. and joined an accounting firm; joined Pepsi-Cola Company, where he was Executive Vice President and CFO responsible for making the initial contact with Frito-Lay, Inc., and implementing the merger that formed PepsiCo; played 	fronton tennis (which was a demo sport) at 1968 Summer Olympics
Andrew Towne, Class of 2015, member of the team that completed the first human-powered transit of the Drake Passage.
 George Washington Woodruff (February 22, 1864 – March 24, 1934) Penn Law Class of 1895, Coach of Penn Crew (1892 through 1896) and Penn Football (1896 through 1901); as football coach (who originated “guards back,” “delayed pass,” and “flying interference” tactics) he compiled 124-15-2 record, including three undefeated seasons in 1894, 1895 and 1897 earning him election to the College Football Hall of Fame and his teams being recognized as national champions in 1894, 1895, and 1897; also served on number of government positions, chief law officer in the National Forest Service, Acting United States secretary of the interior under President Theodore Roosevelt, Pennsylvania Attorney General, federal judge for Territory of Hawaii

Other
 Daniel Barringer, first person to prove the existence of a meteorite crater on earth, and namesake of the Barringer Meteor Crater in Arizona
 James Harry Covington, co-founder of Covington & Burling; Chief Justice of the Supreme Court of the District of Columbia
 John G. Johnson, lawyer (noted by many to be one of the greatest attorneys in U.S. history) who argued 168 cases before the Supreme Court; twice turned down an appointment to the U.S. Supreme Court
 William Draper Lewis, founder and first director of the American Law Institute
 Edward J. Normand, Counsel, Lloyd's of London
 George Wharton Pepper, founder of Pepper Hamilton LLP, a firm with more than 500 lawyers
 Bernard Segal, past President of the American Bar Association
 Gigi Sohn, Class of 1986, founder of Public Knowledge who also worked for the Ford Foundation.
 John Thomas Taylor, congressional lobbyist for the American Legion
 George W. Wickersham, co-founder of Cadwalader, Wickersham & Taft; Attorney General of the United States; President of the Council on Foreign Relations

Fictional alumni

 Andrew Beckett: gay, HIV-positive lawyer portrayed by Tom Hanks in the 1993 movie Philadelphia; his former boss says he hired him upon his graduation from the law schoolAnthony "Tony" Judson Lawrence portrayed by Paul Newman, a graduate of University of Pennsylvania Law School, in the 1959 film, The Young Philadelphians based on 1956 novel The Philadelphian by Richard P. Powell''

Attended but did not graduate
 Thomas Clinton, executive at Deutsche Bank; key figure in the formation of the US Presbyterian Church
 William Radford Coyle, Pennsylvania representative to the U.S. Congress, 1925–27, 1929–33
 George B. McClellan, U.S. Civil War General; Governor of New Jersey
 George Washington who attended lectures by James Wilson who taught law class in 1789 to President Washington and all the members of his cabinet, which at that time included;
 Thomas Jefferson as first Secretary of State
 Alexander Hamilton as first Secretary of Treasury
 Henry Knox as first Secretary of War
 Edmund Randolph as first United States Attorney General

Notes

Lists of people by university or college in Pennsylvania

Philadelphia-related lists